Serbia competed at the 2022 World Aquatics Championships in Budapest, Hungary from 17 June to 3 July 2022.

Artistic swimming

Serbia's artistic swimming team consisted of 2 athletes (2 female).
Women

Open water swimming

Serbia qualified one male open water swimmer.

Swimming

Serbia's swimming team consisted of 4 male athletes.

Men

Water polo

Summary

Men's tournament

Team roster

Group play

Quarterfinals

5–8th place semifinals

Fifth place game

References

World Aquatics Championships
Nations at the 2022 World Aquatics Championships
2022